Ioan Davies (born 28 November 1999) is a Welsh rugby union player who plays for the Dragons as a fullback. He was a Wales under-20 international.

Davies made his debut for the Cardiff Blues regional team in 2020 having previously played for the Blues academy.

In 2021, Davies joined the Dragons, initially on a loan before signing a permanent contract. 

Davies joined the Jersey Reds on loan in 2021.

References

External links 
Cardiff Blues profile
Dragons profile

Rugby union players from Cardiff
Welsh rugby union players
Cardiff Rugby players
Living people
1999 births
Dragons RFC players
Rugby union fullbacks
Jersey Reds players